Dwayne E. Polataivao (born 30 July 1990) is a Samoan rugby union player. A scrum-half, he played for Moana Pasifika in Super Rugby in 2022. He has also represented  internationally.

Career
He started his professional career playing for the Auckland in 2015, and was first selected for the Samoa national team in 2016.

He joined the Doncaster Knights in 2019.

He was selected for the Samoa national squad ahead of the 2019 World Rugby Pacific Nations Cup.

In September 2020 he was named in the  Mako squad for the 2020 Mitre 10 Cup. He played 7 games for the Mako in the 2020 season as they won their second premiership title in a row.

Polataivao was named in the Moana Pasifika squad to play the Maori All Blacks in late 2020, coming off the bench and scoring a try in a 28-21 loss.

Dwayne attended De La Salle College, Māngere East and won the 2008 National First XV Championship (New Zealand) making it De La Salles first National Championship title.

References

External links
itsrugby.co.uk profile

1990 births
Living people
Samoan rugby union players
Samoa international rugby union players
Rugby union scrum-halves
Auckland rugby union players
Doncaster Knights players
Utah Warriors players
Tasman rugby union players
Moana Pasifika players